John C. Lovell (born October 11, 1967) is an American competitive sailor, four-time Olympian, and Olympic silver medalist. He was born in Baton Rouge, Louisiana.

Career

Lovell has competed in the 1996 Summer Olympics, 2000 Summer Olympics, 2004 Summer Olympics, and the 2008 Summer Olympics. At the 2004 Summer Olympics in Athens, Lovell, along with his partner Charlie Ogletree, won a silver medal in the Tornado class. Coincidentally, he and Ogletree have identical birthdays.

References

 

1967 births
American male sailors (sport)
Living people
Olympic silver medalists for the United States in sailing
Sailors at the 1996 Summer Olympics – Tornado
Sailors at the 2000 Summer Olympics – Tornado
Sailors at the 2004 Summer Olympics – Tornado
Sailors at the 2008 Summer Olympics – Tornado
Southern Yacht Club
Sportspeople from Baton Rouge, Louisiana
Medalists at the 2004 Summer Olympics